Nardia is a genus of liverworts in the family Gymnomitriaceae. Nardia huerlimannii is included in this genus.

Jungermanniales
Jungermanniales genera
Taxonomy articles created by Polbot